Stegodon ("roofed tooth" from the Ancient Greek words , , 'to cover', + , , 'tooth' because of the distinctive ridges on the animal's molars) is an extinct genus of proboscidean, related to elephants. It was originally assigned to the family Elephantidae along with modern elephants but is now placed in the extinct family Stegodontidae. Like elephants, Stegodon had teeth with plate-like lophs that are different from those of more primitive proboscideans like gomphotheres and mastodons. The oldest fossils of the genus are found in Late Miocene strata in Asia, likely originating from the more archaic Stegolophodon, shortly afterwards migrating into Africa. While the genus became extinct in Africa during the Pliocene, Stegodon remained widespread in Asia until the end of the Pleistocene.

Morphology

Size
Some species of Stegodon were amongst the largest proboscideans. Size varies across species, large stegodonts are comparable in size with modern elephants. Aside from S. zdanskyi, species like S. ganesha, S. miensis, S. orientalis, S. elephantoides and S. kaisensis are also relatively large bodied. Large stegodonts usually occur in the mainland. There also exist medium sized stegodonts present in large islands like those of Japan and Java. These stegodonts may include: S. aurorae, S. trigonocephalus, S. insignis and S. florensis florensis. Stegodonts that live in smaller islands usually result in further dwarfism.

Dwarfism
S. florensis insularis is an extinct subspecies of Stegodon endemic to the island of Flores, Indonesia, and an example of insular dwarfism. The direct ancestor of S. florensis insularis is the larger-bodied S. florensis florensis, from Early Pleistocene and early Middle Pleistocene sites on Flores. Remains of S. florensis insularis are known from the cave of Liang Bua.

Similar to modern-day elephants, stegodonts were likely good swimmers, as their fossils are frequently encountered on Asian islands (such as Sulawesi, Flores, Timor, Sumba in Indonesia; Luzon and Mindanao in the Philippines; Taiwan; and Japan), all locations not connected by land bridges with the Asian continent even during periods of low sea level (during the cold phases of the Pleistocene). A general evolutionary trend in large mammals on islands is island dwarfing. Many among the dwarfed species of Stegodonts came from the lineage of S. ganesha, S. zdanskyi and S. elephantoides. The smallest dwarf species known is S. sumbaensis from Sumba, with an estimated body mass of 250 kg. The slightly larger S. sondaari, known from Early Pleistocene layers on the Indonesian island of Flores, had an estimated body weight of between 355 and 650 kg. Philippine pygmy stegodonts also have a small stature bigger than or around the size of S. sondaari and S. sompoensis of Celebes, with S. mindanensis having a projected weight of 400 kg. S. luzonensis and S. sompoensis have estimated masses of around 1,300 kg and 1,000 kg respectively. A medium- to large-sized stegodont, S. florensis, with a body weight of about 1,700 kg, appeared about 850,000 years ago, and then also evolved into a dwarf form, S. f. insularis, with an estimated body mass of about 570 kg. The latter was contemporaneous with, and hunted by, the dwarf hominin Homo floresiensis, and disappeared about 49,600 years ago, earlier than initially thought. Dwarf stegodonts were believed to be the main prey of the still-extant Komodo dragon before modern humans introduced their modern main prey in its range, banded pig, rusa deer, and water buffalo.

Ecology 
Like modern elephants, but unlike more primitive proboscideans, Stegodon is thought to have chewed using a proal movement (a forward stroke from the back to the front) of the lower jaws. Based on dental microwear analysis, populations of Stegodon from the Pleistocene of China and Southeast Asia were found to be browsers, with clear niche differentiation from sympatric Elephas populations, which tended towards mixed feeding (both browsing and grazing).

Taxonomy

In the past, stegodonts were believed to be the ancestors of the true elephants and mammoths, but currently they are believed to have no modern descendants. Stegodon is likely derived from Stegolophodon, an extinct genus known from the Miocene of Asia. Stegodon is generally considered to be more closely related to elephants and mammoths than either gomphotheres or mastodons. Some taxonomists consider the stegodonts a subfamily of the Elephantidae. The most important difference between Stegodon and (other) Elephantidae can be observed in the molars. Stegodont molars consist of a series of low, roof-shaped ridges, whereas in elephants, each ridge has become a high-crowned plate. Furthermore, stegodont skeletons are more robust and compact than those of elephants.

In Bardia National Park in Nepal, a population of Indian elephants, possibly due to inbreeding, exhibits many Stegodon-like morphological features. These primitive features are considered recent mutations rather than atavisms.

Fossils of the small, specialized stegodont S. aurorae are found in the Osaka Plain, Japan, and date from around 2 million to 7 million years ago. This species possibly evolved from S. shinshuensis.

Phylogeny

The following cladogram shows the placement of the genus Stegodon among other proboscideans, based on hyoid characteristics:

List of species 

 Stegodon kaisensis Late Miocene – Pliocene, Africa
 Stegodon zdanskyi Late Miocene – Pliocene, China
 Stegodon huananensis Early Pleistocene, China
 Stegodon orientalis Middle – Late Pleistocene, China, Southeast Asia, Japan
 Stegodon namadicus/S. insignis/S. ganesa Pliocene – Late Pleistocene, India
 Stegodon miensis Pliocene, Japan
 Stegodon protoaurorae Late Pliocene – Early Pleistocene, Japan
 Stegodon aurorae Early Pleistocene – early Middle Pleistocene, Japan
 Stegodon sondaari Early Pleistocene, Flores
 Stegodon florensis Middle – Late Pleistocene, Flores
 Stegodon luzonensis Pleistocene, Philippines
 Stegodon trigonocephalus Pleistocene, Java
 Stegodon sompoensis Pleistocene, Sulawesi
 Stegodon sumbaensis Pleistocene, Sumbawa
 Stegodon timorensis Pleistocene, Timor
An indeterminate Stegodon molar of an uncertain locality and age is known from Greece, representing the only record of the genus in Europe.

Extinction 
Stegodon became extinct in the Indian subcontinent, mainland Southeast Asia and China by the end of the Late Pleistocene epoch, while Asian elephants, which existed in sympatry with Stegodon in these regions, are still extant. The survival of the Asian elephant as opposed to Stegodon has been suggested to be due to its more flexible diet in comparison to Stegodon.  A review of 130 papers written about 180 different sites with proboscidean remains in southern China revealed Stegodon to have been more common than Asian elephants; the papers gave many recent radiocarbon dates, the youngest being 2,150 BCE (4,100 BP). However, Turvey et al. (2013) reported that one of the faunal assemblages including supposed fossils of Holocene Stegodon (from Gulin, Sichuan Province) is actually late Pleistocene in age; other supposed fossils of Holocene stegodonts were lost and their age cannot be verified. The authors concluded that the latest confirmed occurrences of Stegodon from China are from the late Pleistocene, and that its Holocene survival cannot be substantiated.

References

Stegodontidae
Miocene proboscideans
Miocene mammals of Asia
Miocene mammals of Africa
Pliocene mammals of Africa
Pliocene mammals of Asia
Pleistocene mammals of Africa
Pleistocene mammals of Asia
Pliocene proboscideans
Pleistocene proboscideans
Miocene genus first appearances
Prehistoric placental genera
Fossil taxa described in 1847
Taxa named by Hugh Falconer
Pleistocene genus extinctions